William McGregor may refer to:

William McGregor (football) (1846–1911), founder of the Football League
William McGregor (judoka) (born 1949), Canadian Olympic judoka
William McGregor (politician) (1836–1903), Canadian businessman and political figure
William McGregor (director) (born 1987), British screenwriter and director
William B. McGregor (born 1952), Australian linguist and professor
William Roy McGregor (1894–1977), New Zealand zoologist and early conservationist
Will McGregor (Wild Roses), a character on Wild Roses
Billy McGregor (1876–1919), Australian rules footballer
Bill McGregor, football player in the 1973 CFL Draft
Willie McGregor, Mansfield Town F.C. player
Billy McGregor (ice hockey), ice hockey player in the 1938 Memorial Cup

See also
William MacGregor (disambiguation)
William Gregor (1761–1817), British clergyman and mineralogist